Aliabad Castle is a historical castle located in Taft County in Yazd Province; the longevity of this fortress dates back to the Historical periods after Islam.

References 

Castles in Iran